Face/Off is a 1997 American science fiction action thriller film directed by John Woo, written by Mike Werb and Michael Colleary, and starring John Travolta and Nicolas Cage.

The first Hollywood film in which Woo was given major creative control, Face/Off earned critical acclaim for the performances by Cage and Travolta and its stylized action sequences. The film earned $245 million worldwide, making it the 11th highest-grossing film of 1997, and was nominated for an Academy Award for Sound Effects Editing (Mark Stoeckinger and Per Hallberg) at the 70th Academy Awards. Since its release, the film gained a strong cult following and it is considered by many as one of John Woo’s best films.

Plot
FBI Special Agent Sean Archer survives an assassination attempt by homicidal sociopath Castor Troy, but the bullet penetrates Archer's chest and strikes his son Michael, accidentally killing the boy. Six years later, Archer's vendetta against Troy culminates in his team ambushing Troy, who is with his younger brother and accomplice Pollux, at a remote desert airstrip. Troy goads Archer with knowledge of a bomb located somewhere in Los Angeles set to go off in a few days, before being knocked into a coma before Archer can learn more. Pollux, in custody, affirms that the bomb is real but refuses to reveal its location.

In secret, Archer reluctantly undergoes a highly experimental face transplant procedure by Dr. Malcolm Walsh to take on Castor Troy's face, voice, and appearance. Archer-as-Troy is taken to the same high-security prison where Pollux is being held. He manages to convince Pollux that he is Troy, and gains information on the bomb's location. Troy unexpectedly awakens from his coma and discovers his face missing. He calls his gang, and they force Dr. Walsh to transplant Archer's face onto him. Troy then kills the only people who know of the transplant. At the prison, Archer-as-Troy prepares to tell Biondi of the location but is surprised when Troy-as-Archer appears. Troy-as-Archer gloats that no one knows of the transplant, and that he will take over Archer's life.

Pollux is freed when he willingly tells Troy-as-Archer of the bomb's location, and Troy-as-Archer disarms the bomb in a dramatic fashion. Troy-as-Archer earns admiration from the FBI office and becomes close to Archer's wife Eve and daughter Jamie, whom Archer had been neglecting while chasing down Troy. Back at the prison, Archer-as-Troy escapes after staging a riot and retreats to Troy's headquarters. He meets Sasha, the sister of Troy's primary drug kingpin, and her son Adam, who reminds him of Michael. Archer-as-Troy discovers that Adam is Troy's son. Troy-as-Archer learns of Archer-as-Troy's escape and hastily assembles a team to raid his headquarters.

The raid turns into a bloodbath and many FBI agents and several members of Troy's gang, including Pollux, are killed, while Archer, Sasha, and Adam are able to escape. Archer's supervisor, Director Victor Lazarro, blames Troy-as-Archer for the numerous slayings. Troy-as-Archer, furious over Pollux's death, kills Lazarro and makes it look like a heart attack. Troy-as-Archer is promoted to acting director. Archer-as-Troy finds safety for Sasha and Adam. Then he approaches Eve and convinces her to test Troy-as-Archer's blood to prove his identity. After testing the blood and being convinced of her husband's identity, Eve tells Archer that Troy will be vulnerable at Lazarro's funeral.

At the ceremony, Archer-as-Troy finds that Troy-as-Archer has anticipated his actions and taken Eve hostage. Sasha arrives, and a gunfight ensues; Sasha manages to save Eve after taking a bullet. Archer-as-Troy promises a dying Sasha that he will take care of Adam and raise him away from criminal life. In a fight between the rivals outside, Jamie shoots and injures Archer-as-Troy. Troy-as-Archer flees the church with Archer-as-Troy pursuing him. Troy-as-Archer briefly takes Jamie hostage, but she escapes by stabbing him with the butterfly knife that Troy-as-Archer had given her for self-defense. Troy-as-Archer reaches the docks and commandeers a speedboat, and Archer-as-Troy follows and commandeers one of his own.

A chase ensues, that ends when Archer-as-Troy forces Troy-as-Archer to the shore by collision. With the boats grounded, Archer-as-Troy bests Troy-as-Archer in a melee fight. Troy-as-Archer attempts to mutilate his (Archer's) face to taunt and distract Archer-as-Troy, but Archer-as-Troy instead gains the upper hand and kills Troy-as-Archer by impaling him with a spear gun, avenging the deaths of Michael and all of Troy's other victims. Backup agents arrive and address Archer-as-Troy as Archer, having been convinced by Eve of Archer's true identity. After the face transplant surgery is reversed, Archer returns home, where he adopts Adam into his family, keeping his promise to Sasha.

Cast 

 John Travolta as Sean Archer
 Nicolas Cage as Castor Troy
 Joan Allen as Eve Archer
 Alessandro Nivola as Pollux Troy
 Gina Gershon as Sasha Hassler
 Dominique Swain as Jamie Archer
 Nick Cassavetes as Dietrich Hassler
 Harve Presnell as Victor Lazarro
 Colm Feore as Dr. Malcolm Walsh
 John Carroll Lynch as Prison Guard Walton
 CCH Pounder as Hollis Miller
 Robert Wisdom as Tito Biondi
 Margaret Cho as Wanda Chang
 Thomas Jane as Burke Hicks
 James Denton as Buzz
 Tommy Flanagan as Leo
 Matt Ross as Loomis
 Danny Masterson as Karl
 Chris Bauer as Ivan Dubov
 Romy Walthall as Kimberly
 Myles Jeffrey as Michael Archer
 David McCurley as Adam Hassler
 Lauren Sinclair as Agent Winters

Production
Face/Off was a spec script which writers Mike Werb and Michael Colleary optioned to Joel Silver and Warner Bros. in 1991. The option expired in 1994 and the project was purchased by Paramount Pictures. American director and producer Rob Cohen was originally set to direct the film but when the project was in a turnaround Cohen left to direct Dragonheart. John Woo became attached in 1996. The first actors who were envisioned by the writers to play Sean Archer and Castor Troy were Sylvester Stallone and Arnold Schwarzenegger due to their oversized on-screen personas.

Johnny Depp wanted to play Sean Archer but passed on the role after reading the script. John Woo instead hired John Travolta and Nicolas Cage to play those characters.  Michael Douglas served as an executive producer. Werb and Colleary have cited White Heat (1949) as an influence on the plot. With an $80 million production budget, Face/Off made heavy use of action set pieces including several violent shootouts and a boat chase filmed in the Los Angeles area. The boat scene at the end of the film was shot in San Pedro. Calling the brothers Castor and Pollux is a reference to Greek mythology; Castor and Pollux are the twins transformed by the ancient Greek god Zeus into the constellation Gemini.

Music

The Face/Off soundtrack was released by Hollywood Records on July 1, 1997, the week following the film's release. This was the first film to be composed by John Powell.

Several pieces of music and songs were used in the film but not included in the soundtrack. These include:
 "Hallelujah" from oratorio Messiah – George Frideric Handel
 Pamina's Aria "Ach, ich fühl's" from "Die Zauberflöte" – Wolfgang Amadeus Mozart
 "Prelude in D-flat, Op. 28, No. 15" ("Raindrop") – Frédéric Chopin
 "Papa's Got a Brand New Bag" – James Brown
 "Over the Rainbow" (Harold Arlen and Yip Harburg) – Olivia Newton-John
 "Christiansands" – Tricky
 "Don't Lose Your Head" – INXS
 "Miserere mei, Deus (VV.1-4 & 17-20)" – Gregorio Allegri

Release

Home media
Face/Off was released on Region 1 DVD on October 7, 1998. A 10th Anniversary Collector's Edition DVD was released on September 11, 2007 and it was also released on the now-defunct HD DVD format on October 30, 2007 in the United States.

The film was released on Blu-ray Disc in the United Kingdom on October 1, 2007 by Buena Vista Home Entertainment, and was released in the United States on May 20, 2008 by Paramount Home Entertainment.

Reception

Box office
Face/Off was released in North America on June 27, 1997 and earned $23,387,530 on its opening weekend, ranking number one in the domestic box office ahead of Hercules. It went on to become the 11th highest domestic and 14th worldwide grossing film of 1997, earning a domestic total of $112,276,146 and $133,400,000 overseas for a total of worldwide gross of $245,676,146.

Critical response

The review aggregation website Rotten Tomatoes records that 92% of 91 critical reviews were positive, with an average rating of 7.8/10. The website's critical consensus reads: "John Travolta and Nicolas Cage play cat-and-mouse (and literally play each other) against a beautifully stylized backdrop of typically elegant, over-the-top John Woo violence." On Metacritic, the film received a score of 82 out of 100 from 26 critics, indicating "universal acclaim". Audiences polled by CinemaScore gave the film an average grade of "B+" on an A+ to F scale.

The role reversal between Travolta and Cage was a subject of praise, as were the stylized, violent action sequences. Critic Roger Ebert of the Chicago Sun-Times gave the film three out of four and remarked: "Here, using big movie stars and asking them to play each other, Woo and his writers find a terrific counterpoint to the action scenes: All through the movie, you find yourself reinterpreting every scene as you realize the 'other' character is 'really' playing it." Rolling Stones Peter Travers said of the film, "You may not buy the premise or the windup, but with Travolta and Cage taking comic and psychic measures of their characters and their own careers, there is no resisting Face/Off. This you gotta see." Richard Corliss of Time said that the film "isn't just a thrill ride, it's a rocket into the thrilling past, when directors could scare you with how much emotion they packed into a movie."

Barbara Shulgasser of the San Francisco Examiner called the movie "idiotic" and argued that "a good director would choose the best of the six ways and put it in his movie. Woo puts all six in. If you keep your eyes closed during a Woo movie and open them every six minutes, you'll see everything you need to know to have a perfectly lovely evening at the cinema."

The film was nominated for the Academy Award for Best Sound Effects Editing (Mark Stoeckinger and Per Hallberg) at the 70th Academy Awards, but lost to another Paramount film Titanic. Face/Off also won Saturn Awards for Best Director and Best Writing, and the MTV Movie Awards for Best Action Sequence (the speedboat chase) and Best On-Screen Duo for Travolta and Cage.

It has been labelled as part of the "holy trinity" of Nicolas Cage films, along with Con Air (1997) and The Rock (1996).

Face/Off is said to have inspired Infernal Affairs. However, Infernal Affairs director Andrew Lau wanted to have a more realistic situation; instead of a physical face change, Lau wanted to have the characters swap identities. The concept of "bian lian" or "change face", a technique traditionally used in Chinese opera, may have been used here to depict the fluid and seamless morph of Chen and Lau's characters' identities between the "good" and "bad" sides. Infernal Affairs in turn has spawned several adaptations, notably The Departed directed by Martin Scorsese which won the Academy Award for Best Picture.

Sequel
Paramount Pictures announced in September 2019 plans to remake Face/Off with a new cast. David Permut will be executive producer, with Neal Moritz to produce and Oren Uziel to write. In February 2021, it was reported that Adam Wingard would direct and the film would be a direct sequel to the original.

Adaptation

References

External links 

 
 
 
 
 
 

1997 action thriller films
1990s chase films
1990s science fiction action films
1997 action films
1997 films
American action thriller films
American chase films
American films about revenge
American science fiction action films
Body swapping in films
Films about the Federal Bureau of Investigation
Films about assassinations
Films about child death
Films about identity theft
Films about terrorism in the United States
Films directed by John Woo
Films scored by John Powell
Films set in 1991
Films set in 1997
Films set in California
Films set in Los Angeles
Films shot in California
Films shot in Los Angeles
Films with screenplays by Michael Colleary
Gun fu films
Paramount Pictures films
Touchstone Pictures films
1990s English-language films
1990s American films